West Ruislip is a station on Ickenham High Road on the borders of Ickenham and western Ruislip in the London Borough of Hillingdon in Greater London, formerly in Middlesex. It is served by London Underground (LU) and National Rail trains on independent platforms. It is the western terminus of the Central line's West Ruislip branch; Ruislip Gardens is the next Underground station towards central London. The Central line and Chiltern Railways platforms and ticket office hall are managed by LU. The closest station on the Metropolitan and Piccadilly lines is Ickenham,  from West Ruislip Station.

History

The station was opened on 2 April 1906 as Ruislip & Ickenham by the Great Western and Great Central Joint Railway (GW&GCJR). The GW&GCJR connected London and the Midlands via High Wycombe and provided an alternative route to the Great Central Railway's (GCR's) main line through Aylesbury, Harrow and Wembley which shared its route with the Metropolitan Railway.

Prior to the Second World War plans had been made for a number of extensions to the Central line. The London Passenger Transport Board's (LPTB's) 1935-40 New Works programme included the extension of the Central line to run alongside the Great Western Railway (GWR) tracks from North Acton to South Ruislip and the GW&GCJR tracks from there as far as Denham; the post-war introduction of the Metropolitan Green Belt caused the extension to be cut back to West Ruislip. Had the Central line extension been completed as planned, the next station would have been Harefield Road. Preparatory work on this section had started just before the war and a section of trackbed constructed for the extension can be seen to the west of the road overbridge, beyond the buffer stops of the Central line tracks alongside the National Rail line.

The additional tracks were constructed by the GWR on behalf of the LPTB and on 30 June 1947, the first section of the western extension opened from North Acton to Greenford. On the same date the station name was changed to West Ruislip (for Ickenham).

Central line services began running from West Ruislip on 21 November 1948.

The station building was built by British Railways for London Underground and was not completed until the 1960s and at about the same time the sub-title was omitted from the station name. Some Central line stations with older signage still show the longer name on the line diagrams on their platforms.

The station was transferred from the Western Region of British Rail to the London Midland Region on 24 March 1974.

The London Borough of Hillingdon announced in June 2011 that it would be lobbying Transport for London to have the Central line extended from West Ruislip to Uxbridge. Such a project would require a business case approved by TfL and the completion of signal upgrade work on the Metropolitan line.

Services

National Rail – Chiltern Railways 
The Monday – Friday off-peak service consists of:

1 train per hour to 
1 train per hour to 

A parliamentary train used to run once a day on weekdays from London Paddington to West Ruislip. The train now terminates at High Wycombe, passing West Ruislip without stopping.

London Underground – Central Line 
The peak time (06:30-09:30 & 16:00-19:00 Mon to Fri) service currently consists of:

 7tph to Epping
 5tph to Debden

The off-peak service currently consists of:

 9tph to Epping

Present day
West Ruislip station is aligned approximately east–west with the main station buildings on the road overbridge across the lines at the western end of the station. The station has four platforms; two each for London Underground and National Rail services. The London Underground tracks are south of the National Rail ones and operate from an island platform whilst the National Rail platforms are outside of their tracks. The National Rail platforms are also served by a separate station building north of the tracks and adjacent to the car park. In a legacy of the original scheme to continue the extension to Denham, the Central line tracks continue for a short distance beyond the station before ending at buffers. The intended alignment of the unbuilt tracks can be seen from the width of the unused railway land south of the existing tracks.

The Central line's Ruislip depot is east of West Ruislip station, and has a connection via a shunting neck to the Network Rail westbound track west of the station to allow rolling stock and material deliveries. The depot also has a connection to the Uxbridge branch tracks of the Metropolitan and Piccadilly Lines which pass under the Central line east of West Ruislip; it is used only for empty stock movements and works train access.  Two sidings west of the station to the north of the running lines provide layover facilities for works trains.

There are ticket barriers at the main entrance to the station, controlling access to the Central line platforms from the public highway and the pedestrian walkway linking the car park to the station.  The Chiltern platforms can be reached from the car park walkway without tickets.

Connections
London Buses routes 278, U1 and U10 serve the station.

Nearby places

 Ruislip
 Ickenham
 Adjacent to the station is the former site of RAF West Ruislip, which until 2006 was a co-located United States Navy facility and elementary school, leased from the Ministry of Defence. This has been redeveloped for residential use.

References

Further reading

External links

Central line (London Underground) stations
Railway stations in the London Borough of Hillingdon
Tube stations in the London Borough of Hillingdon
Former Great Western and Great Central Joint Railway stations
Railway stations in Great Britain opened in 1906
Railway stations served by Chiltern Railways